The South Zone cricket team or Prime Bank South Zone is a first-class cricket team that represents south-western Bangladesh in the Bangladesh Cricket League (BCL). It is a composite team of two Bangladeshi first-class teams: Barisal Division and Khulna Division. South Zone has played in the BCL from the opening 2012–13 season and has won the BCL four times, the most by any team.

Players

Current squad
Players with international caps are listed in bold

References

Bangladesh Cricket League
Bangladeshi first-class cricket teams
Barishal Division
Sport in Khulna Division
Cricket clubs established in 2012
2012 establishments in Bangladesh